Shan Ying (born 7 August 1978) is a Chinese swimmer and Olympic medalist. She participated at the 1996 Summer Olympics in Atlanta, winning a silver medal in 4 x 100 metre freestyle relay, and a bronze medal in 4 x 100 metre medley relay.

References

External links

1978 births
Living people
Chinese female freestyle swimmers
Olympic swimmers of China
Olympic silver medalists for China
Olympic bronze medalists for China
Olympic bronze medalists in swimming
Swimmers at the 1996 Summer Olympics
Medalists at the 1996 Summer Olympics
World record setters in swimming
World Aquatics Championships medalists in swimming
Medalists at the FINA World Swimming Championships (25 m)
Asian Games medalists in swimming
Swimmers at the 1994 Asian Games
Swimmers at the 1998 Asian Games
Asian Games gold medalists for China
Asian Games silver medalists for China
Medalists at the 1994 Asian Games
Medalists at the 1998 Asian Games
Olympic silver medalists in swimming